The Elk Hills Oil Field (formerly the Naval Petroleum Reserve No. 1) is a large oil field in western Kern County, in the Elk Hills of the San Joaquin Valley, California in the United States, about  west of Bakersfield.

It is larger than the Rio Vista Gas Field, the largest non-associated natural gas field in the state.

The principal operator of the field is California Resources Corporation. This company spun off in  November 2014 from Occidental Petroleum.

Setting
To the north, east, and southeast are the agricultural fields of the San Joaquin Valley, and to the southwest is the Buena Vista Valley. Across that valley is the town of Taft, and the enormous Midway-Sunset Oil Field, the largest in California. West of the Elk Hills is the large McKittrick Oil Field, and northwest is the even larger Cymric Oil Field. Although the Elk Hills is only one field of many in a region of oil fields, it is geographically distinct because its boundaries correspond with the shape of the hills that give it its name.

Skyline Road, which is closed to public entry, follows the long axis of the field. It begins near McKittrick and goes east, following the crest of the hills. Perpendicular to this road, and about halfway down its length, is Elk Hills Road, which connects the town of Taft to the south with Buttonwillow to the north. Two guarded gates to the California Resources Corporation operations, 3 and 4, make up the intersection with Skyline Road on the summit of the range.

Geology

The Elk Hills Oil Field has a complex stratigraphy compared to other nearby fields, many of which are single large pools in simple structural traps. Thirteen separate oil pools have been identified so far in the Elk Hills Field, in rock units ranging in age from Oligocene to Pleistocene.

Production and political history

The official "discovery" well, however, was drilled by the Standard Oil Company ("Hay No. 1") in January, 1919. By 1912 the field's capacity was considered to be significant enough that President William Howard Taft, concerned about the long-term availability of petroleum for the U.S. Navy, designated the region as the nation's first Naval Petroleum Reserve.

The dusty Elk Hills have a prominent role in U.S. political history, for it was the lease of this land by Secretary of the Interior Albert B. Fall, to Pan American Petroleum in 1922 in return for personal loans at no interest, that brought on the Teapot Dome scandal which ruined the reputation of the administration of Warren G. Harding, now commonly considered to be one of the most corrupt in U.S. history. In 1927 the U.S. Supreme Court invalidated the lease, and returned the Elk Hills to the U.S. government.

The oil field went largely untapped, held as a reserve, until the mid-1970s, when Congress passed the Naval Petroleum Reserves Production Act in response to the 1973-1974 Arab Oil Embargo. In 1976 the Ford Administration opened the lands for drilling and production again.  NPR-1, operated by Williams Brothers Engineering Company, reached peak production in 1981, pumping  of oil out of the Stevens Pool in that year alone.

A drive to privatize some government lands during the mid-1990s succeeded in 1997 with the sale of the reserve to Occidental Petroleum, the highest bidder. Occidental took over operations in early 1998 and has been the principal operator since then; in 2008 they had a 78% interest in the oil field.

2009 discovery
Occidental Petroleum announced in 2009 that it had made a major discovery of oil and natural gas in Kern County, calling it the largest onshore California oil and gas discovery in 35 years. Occidental estimated the new find to contain 150 million barrels of oil equivalent (BOE), of which about one-third is oil.

2018 acquisition
California Resources Corporation (CRC), a spinoff from Occidental Petroleum, acquired Elk Hills Oil Field as its largest acquisition in April 2018, and also acquired the remaining surface and mineral rights to the field from Chevron.

Ecology
The oil neststraw (Stylocline citroleum), a rare flowering plant endemic to the Elk Hills area, was given its name because it is limited to oil field country.

References

Notes

Further reading
 California Oil and Gas Fields, Volumes I, II and III. Vol. I (1998), Vol. II (1992), Vol. III (1982). California Department of Conservation, Division of Oil, Gas, and Geothermal Resources (DOGGR). 1,472 pp. Elk Hills field information is on pp. 168–173. PDF file available on CD from www.consrv.ca.gov.
 California Department of Conservation, Oil and Gas Statistics, Annual Report, December 31, 2006.
 Center for Public Integrity: timeline of events at Elk Hills

External links

Elk Hills Initially Underestimated, from "100 Years of Oil" (Bakersfield Californian)
Panoramic view of Elk Hills Oil Field in 2002

Oil fields in Kern County, California
Natural gas fields in the United States
Oil fields in California
Teapot Dome scandal
Naval Petroleum Reserve